José Miguel Reyes (born 19 September 1992) is a Venezuelan international footballer who plays for Aragua, as a striker.

Career
Reyes was born in Valencia, Venezuela. He has played club football for Zulia, Carabobo, Deportivo Anzoátegui and Deportivo Táchira.

He played for the Venezuela under-20 team at the 2011 South American Youth Championship scoring against Uruguay, and made his international debut for the senior Venezuela team in March 2011 in a friendly match against Argentina.

References

1992 births
Living people
Sportspeople from Valencia, Venezuela
Venezuelan footballers
Venezuela international footballers
Venezuela under-20 international footballers
Association football forwards
Venezuelan Primera División players
Zulia F.C. players
Carabobo F.C. players
Deportivo Anzoátegui players
Deportivo Táchira F.C. players
Asociación Civil Deportivo Lara players